The following are the national records in track cycling in Poland maintained by the Polish Cycling Federation (in Polish: Polski Związek Kolarski).

Men

Women

References

External links
 Polish Cycling Federation official website
 Polish Track Cycling Records

Poland
Records
Track cycling
track cycling